John Holmes (January 6, 1904 – June 22, 1962), born John Albert Holmes Jr., was a poet and critic.  He was born in Somerville, Massachusetts, and both attended and taught at Tufts University where he was a professor of literature and modern poetry for 28 years. He wrote several volumes of poetry and the lyrics to several Unitarian Universalist hymns., including "The People's Peace". He taught John Ciardi and Anne Sexton.

Early years
Holmes was born in Somerville, Massachusetts, son of John A. Holmes, Sr. and Mary Florence (Murdock) Holmes. His father was an engineer who specialized in building dams and bridges. John attended Somerville public schools. Holmes’ early adulthood was marred by his struggle with alcoholism and the nightmarish end to his first marriage when his wife slit her wrists and
bled to death over his papers.

Professional life
In 1934 he became an instructor at Tufts. He worked there the rest of his life, rising to full professor in 1960. Holmes's students admired him. "When he taught," wrote Jerome Barron, "something magical happened. He made you want to write and understand poetry. He didn't lecture; he encouraged. Simplicity, and writing that went from the inside out, this is what he was after."

His works
Holmes wrote several volumes of poetry:

Along the Row (1929)

Address to the Living (1937)

Fair Warning (1939)

The Poet's Word (1939)

Map of my Country (1943)

Little Treasury of Love Poems (1950)

The Double Root (1950)

The Symbols (1955)

Writing poetry (1960)

The Fortune Teller (1961)

References

External links
Biography of Holmes, written by his wife Doris Holmes from the Harvard Square Library Webpage on Notable American Unitarians
 Second John Holmes Memorial Poetry Reading, April 5, 2006
  Reviews of Holmes' books
John Holmes Collection at Tufts Digital Collections and Archives
John A. Holmes papers, 1813-1976 - finding aid
Biography of Holmes at John Holmes Collection site

1904 births
1962 deaths
Boston Evening Transcript people
Writers from Somerville, Massachusetts
20th-century American poets